Virgil Atanasiu (born 21 May 1937) is a Romanian former sports shooter. He competed in the 25 metre pistol event at the 1968 Summer Olympics.

References

1937 births
Living people
Romanian male sport shooters
Olympic shooters of Romania
Shooters at the 1968 Summer Olympics
People from Dumbrăveni